The Electronics and Technical Services (ETS) is the Electronic Intelligence (ELINT) arm of India's external intelligence agency Research and Analysis Wing (R&AW).

Background 
Established in the mid 1980s under then R&AW's chief N. F. Suntook, the organisation, it is housed in the CGO complex in New Delhi. ETS is believed to be involved in ELINT roles, not restricted but also includes jamming and spoofing - Electronic Warfare (EW). ETS also involved in Electronic Surveillance Measures (ESMs), Telemetry (TELINT), Tracking and monitoring data links, interception and monitoring of navigation signals and other ELINT and EW methods.

Organisation 
The head of R&AW is designated "Secretary (R)" in the Cabinet Secretariat. Two Special Joint Secretaries, reporting to the Additional Secretary, head the Electronics and Technical Department which is the nodal agency for Electronics and Technical Services (ETS) and the Radio Research Centre (RRC) are under the direct command of the Secretary (R).

Officers of the RAW are members of a specialized service, the Research and Analysis Service (RAS), but several officers also serve on deputation from other services. This applies to RAW's sub-organizations like the Aviation Research Centre (ARC), the Radio Research Centre (RRC) or the Electronics and Technical Service (ETS).

However exact nature of the operations conducted by the ETS is classified.

References 

Research and Analysis Wing
Government agencies with year of establishment missing
1980s establishments in India